ECB may refer to:

Organizations
 European Central Bank
 European Chemicals Bureau of the European Commission
 ECB Project (Emergency Capacity Building Project), to improve humanitarian response
 England and Wales Cricket Board
 Emirates Cricket Board
 East Coast Bays AFC, a New Zealand football club
 Environmental Control Board, New York City, US
 Equatorial Commercial Bank, later Spire Bank, Kenya

Education
 Environmental Campus Birkenfeld of the Trier University of Applied Sciences,  Rhineland-Palatinate, Germany
 Wisconsin Educational Communications Board, US
 Government Engineering College Bikaner, Rajasthan, India

Technology
 Electronic codebook, a block cipher  encryption mode
 Electronically controlled brake, Toyota
 Europe Card Bus, a 1977 8-bit computer bus
 Ethylene copolymer bitumen, for waterproofing
 Entity-control-boundary, an architectural pattern in software design

Other uses
 External commercial borrowing, in India
 Reading electric multiple units, a class of trains